Bowsey Hill is a hill in Berkshire, England. Rising to a height of 140 metres, it has some five or six houses on its summit.

Hills of Berkshire